Derwent Park is situated in Rowlands Gill, Tyne and Wear, England. The park is often incorrectly called Rowlands Gill Park as a result. The park has a caravan site and has many play areas for children. Fishing on the River Derwent, which runs through the park, is priced at £2.50 per permit. The fish include brown trout, grayling and Atlantic salmon.

Parks and open spaces in Tyne and Wear